Dil (also Romanized as Dīl) is a village in Boyer Ahmad-e Garmsiri Rural District, in the Central District of Gachsaran County, Kohgiluyeh and Boyer-Ahmad Province, Iran. As of the 2006 census, its population was 2,087 from 482 families.

References 

Populated places in Gachsaran County